A Flirt's Mistake is a 1914 American short comedy film featuring Roscoe "Fatty" Arbuckle. The silent movie, produced by the Keystone Film Company, contains no onscreen cast or crew credits.

Cast
 Roscoe 'Fatty' Arbuckle
 Minta Durfee
 William Hauber as Cop
 Edgar Kennedy as The Rajah
 Virginia Kirtley
 Henry Lehrman (unconfirmed)
 George Nichols as Man in park

See also
 Fatty Arbuckle filmography

References

External links

 
 

1914 films
Silent American comedy films
1914 comedy films
1914 short films
American silent short films
American black-and-white films
Films directed by George Nichols
American comedy short films
1910s American films